Lucas Michel Mendes (born 3 July 1990) is a Brazilian professional footballer who plays as a centre back but can also play as left back for Qatari club Al-Wakrah.

Club career
On 15 August 2014, after playing 2 years with Olympique de Marseille, he signed for Qatari club El Jaish.

References

External links
transfer to Marseille 

1990 births
Living people
Association football fullbacks
Association football central defenders
Brazilian footballers
Brazilian expatriate footballers
Coritiba Foot Ball Club players
Olympique de Marseille players
El Jaish SC players
Al-Duhail SC players
Al-Gharafa SC players
Al-Wakrah SC players
Campeonato Brasileiro Série A players
Campeonato Brasileiro Série B players
Ligue 1 players
Qatar Stars League players
Expatriate footballers in France
Expatriate footballers in Qatar
Footballers from Curitiba